Yazi plain is a plain located between Bazarchay and Hekari rivers in Gubadli district of Azerbaijan. Animal husbandry, wheat, tobacco and grape cultivation were widespread in the area before the Armenian occupation.

About 
The tomb of Javanshir dating back to the 14 th century is located on the Yazi plain.

Toponymy 
The name of “Yazı düzü” is derived from the combination of the ancient Turkish word "yazi" meaning "desert, wide plain" and the Azerbaijani word "duz" meaning plain. In the territory of Azerbaijan, toponyms with "Yazi" particles are more common. For example: Aghyazi, Garayazi, Agcayazi and others.

Geography 
The Yazi plain, which is on the South-eastern end of the Karabakh plateau, descends to 450 m and passes into the sloping and undulating Inja plain. It is triangular in shape. Its length is 30–35 km. It is composed of volcanic-proluvial sediments of the Upper Pliocene. It has a mild warm climate with dry winters. Brown mountain-forest soils are common. There is a xerophytic montane shrubland and dry steppe landscape. Before the Karabakh conflict, animal husbandry was developed, grain, tobacco and grapes were grown.

See also
 Mughan plain
 Garayazi plain

References

Plains of Azerbaijan